Phytophthora pluvialis is a semi-papillate plant pathogen that mainly infects tanoak-Douglas-fir forests of western Oregon. It was reported in Cornwall. UK, in October 2021; the first record for Europe.

Description
Phytophthora pluvialis is homothallic; it forms oogonia in culture. Its oogonia are terminal, smooth and globose, being approximately 30 µm in diameter, and possess amphigynous antheridia. Its oospores are globose and aplerotic, being about 28 µm in diameter. Sporangia formed in water are ovoid and slightly irregular, semi-papillate, terminal or subterminal, and partially caducous with medium-sized pedicels.

References

Further reading
Dick, Margaret Anne, et al. "Pathogenicity of Phytophthora pluvialis to Pinus radiata and its relation with red needle cast disease in New Zealand." New Zealand Journal of Forestry Science 44.6 (2014).
Hood, Ian A., et al. "Decline in vitality of propagules of Phytophthora pluvialis and Phytophthora kernoviae and their inability to contaminate or colonise bark and sapwood of Pinus radiata log segments." New Zealand Journal of Forestry Science 44.1 (2014): 7.
Rolando, Carol, et al. "The use of adjuvants to improve uptake of phosphorous acid applied to Pinus radiata needles for control of foliar Phytophthora diseases." New Zealand Journal of Forestry Science 44.1 (2014): 1–7.

External links

pluvialis
Water mould plant pathogens and diseases
Tree diseases